Music to Eat is the only album ever produced by avant garde rock band Hampton Grease Band.  It was released in 1971.

The album is a double album, which is apocryphally said to have been the second-lowest selling album in Columbia's history, second only to a yoga instructional record. Despite this, Music to Eat has since garnered enough of an interest to warrant Columbia to officially re-issue the album on CD in 1996 and on vinyl in 2018. Music to Eat compares with the likes of Captain Beefheart, Frank Zappa & The Mothers of Invention, and Pere Ubu in establishing a quirky, experimental version of rock and roll.

Reception

Writing for AllMusic, critic Richie Unterberger noted that while the Hampton Grease Band could not quite match the levels of instrumental virtuosity in Zappa's or Beefheart's bands, they were even closer to the "lunatic fringe" than those performers.

In a review for Spin, Byron Coley stated: "Music to Eat was one of the leftfield high points of the Nixon Era, and its essential message about the freedom and power that come from being truly weird remains soothing balm."

In his book on jam bands, Dean Budnick noted the album's "underlying spunk and unmitigated weirdness."

The Vinyl District's Joseph Neff called the album "a grand example of beautifully haywire humanity creating spectacularly singular art," and "one of the true classics of expansionist, genre-bending rock."

Regarding the 1996 CD reissue, the Chicago Reader's Peter Margasak wrote: "Even today it's probably too strange for most listeners–yet it's just as fresh, inventive, and vibrant as it was 25 years ago."

John Corbett called Music to Eat "wondrous," and praised the band's "zany singer-leader, beautiful long-form songs, sinewy guitar, creative writing."

A reviewer at Head Heritage stated that the album "stands alone in the rock canon," and called it "damn near a masterpiece that almost exists outside of history."

In an article for It's Psychedelic Baby! Magazine, Phillip R. Eubanks described the album as "wild happy craziness," and praised the "absolutely excellent guitar players" and "absolutely fantastic drummer and bass player." He concluded: "It is a light hearted beautiful trip... I love it."

Chuck Reece of The Bitter Southerner stated that when he first heard Music to Eat, it made him "feel like somebody had sawed off the top of [his] head and poured in large quantities of Things Teenage Country Boys Didn’t Understand." Upon further listening, he concluded that the musicians had "created a place of true, unadulterated, joyous freedom that gave license to damned near every Southern musician who followed."

Aquarium Drunkard's Jesse Jarnow commented that the album "seemed like music remade from the ground up in a new and pleasing way. The words ricocheted off the meticulous and always-moving instrumental parts, twin guitars springing into conversations that might be telepathic improvisations or bananas compositions."

Track listing

Personnel
 Bruce Hampton — vocals, trumpet
 Glenn Phillips — guitar, saxophone
 Harold Kelling — guitar, vocals
 Mike Holbrook — bass
 Jerry Fields — percussion, vocals

References 

1971 debut albums
Hampton Grease Band albums
Columbia Records albums